Silas Reynolds Barton (May 21, 1872 – November 7, 1916) was an American politician. A Republican, he represented Nebraska's 5th congressional district for one term in the United States House of Representatives.

Biography
Barton was born in New London, Iowa on May 21, 1872, the son of Eli B. Barton and Teressa (Nugen) Barton. He moved with his parents to Hamilton County, Nebraska in 1873, and graduated from Aurora High School. He attended Peru State College. He married Adah Michell and had two children who died in infancy. After his first wife's death in 1909, he married Ellen Tazwell Metcalfe. His son, Silas Barton Jr., died in 1964 at age 50 and is buried at Forest Lawn.

Career
Barton was a farmer and teacher. From 1898 until 1901, he was the deputy treasurer of Hamilton County. In 1901, he became the grand recorder of the Ancient Order of United Workmen and served in that capacity until 1908. He was president for two terms of the Grand Recorders' Association of the United States.

Barton became the Nebraska State Auditor in 1909 and served until his election to the United States Congress in 1913. During his two terms as auditor he was an insurance commissioner and a member of the National Executive Committee of Insurance Commissioners.

Elected in 1913 to the 63rd Congress, Barton was in office from March 4, 1913, until March 3, 1915. He ran for the 65th Congress, but died before the election.

Death
Barton died in Grand Island, Nebraska, on November 7, 1916, at the age of 44. He is interred at Aurora Cemetery in Aurora, Nebraska.

References

External links

1872 births
1916 deaths
People from Henry County, Iowa
People from Hamilton County, Nebraska
Peru State College alumni
Republican Party members of the United States House of Representatives from Nebraska
19th-century American politicians
Nebraska Auditors of Public Accounts